The 2008–09 season was JS Kabylie's 44th season in the Algerian top flight, They competed in National 1, the Algerian Cup, the CAF Confederation Cup and the Champions League.

Squad list
Players and squad numbers last updated on 18 November 2008.Note: Flags indicate national team as has been defined under FIFA eligibility rules. Players may hold more than one non-FIFA nationality.

Competitions

Overview

{| class="wikitable" style="text-align: center"
|-
!rowspan=2|Competition
!colspan=8|Record
!rowspan=2|Started round
!rowspan=2|Final position / round
!rowspan=2|First match
!rowspan=2|Last match
|-
!
!
!
!
!
!
!
!
|-
| National 1

| 
| style="background:silver;"| Runners–up
| 8 August 2008
| 28 May 2009
|-
| Algerian Cup

| colspan=2| Round of 64
| colspan=2| 15 January 2009
|-
| Confederation Cup

| colspan=2| Group stage
| 16 August 2008
| 18 October 2008
|-
| Champions League

| colspan=2| First round
| 15 March 2009
| 4 April 2009
|-
! Total

National 1

League table

Results summary

Results by round

Matches

Algerian Cup

CAF Confederation Cup

Group stage

Group B

CAF Champions League

First round

Squad information

Playing statistics

|-

|-
! colspan=14 style=background:#dcdcdc; text-align:center| Players transferred out during the season

Goalscorers
Includes all competitive matches. The list is sorted alphabetically by surname when total goals are equal.

Transfers

In

Out

Notes

References

JS Kabylie seasons
JS Kabylie